L'air du temps is a French expression that roughly translates to "the current trend" or "fashionable at the moment". 

L'Air du Temps may refer to:

 L'Air du Temps (perfume) by Nina Ricci
 A song on the Florent Pagny albums Châtelet Les Halles and 2
 A song on the Vanessa Paradis album Bliss
 A non-competition section of the Cannes Film Festival in 1976 and 1977

See also
 Zeitgeist